Lotte Jonathans (born 17 September 1977) is a Dutch former badminton player.

Career 
Jonathans made her debut at the Olympics in the 2000 Sydney, reaching the quarter finals of the women's doubles with Nicole van Hooren.

Jonathans made her second appearance at the Olympics in the 2004 Athens. She played in the women's doubles with partner Mia Audina. They had a bye in the first round and defeated Ella Tripp and Joanne Wright of Great Britain in the second. In the quarterfinals, Jonathans and Audina lost to Lee Kyung-won and Ra Kyung-min of South Korea 5–15, 2–15. Jonathans also competed in the mixed doubles with partner Chris Bruil, who was her husband until 2008. They had a bye in the first round and were defeated by Kim Dong-moon and Ra Kyung-min of South Korea in the round of 16.

She captured the women's doubles title with Mia Audina at the 2004 European Badminton Championships in Geneva, Switzerland.
She won gold with the Dutch National badminton team at the 2006 European Women's Team Championships in Thessalonica, Greece. She also won two silver medals (2004 and 2006) and a bronze (2002) with the Dutch squad at the European Mixed Team Championships.

Jonathans also won a bronze (2002) and a silver medal (2006) with the Dutch women's team at the Uber Cup. As a part of the BC Amersfoort team with Yao Jie, Larisa Griga, Dicky Palyama and Eric Pang, Jonathans reached the final of the 2007 European Cup in Amersfoort where they lost against the team of NL Primoriye.

Achievements

European Championships 
Women's doubles

BWF Grand Prix 
The BWF Grand Prix had two levels, the Grand Prix and Grand Prix Gold. It was a series of badminton tournaments sanctioned by the Badminton World Federation (BWF) and played between 2007 and 2017. The World Badminton Grand Prix was sanctioned by the International Badminton Federation from 1983 to 2006.

Women's doubles

Mixed doubles

 BWF Grand Prix Gold tournament
 BWF & IBF Grand Prix tournament

BWF International Challenge/Series 
Women's doubles

Mixed doubles

  BWF International Challenge tournament
  BWF/IBF International Series tournament

References

External links 
 European results
 

1977 births
Living people
Sportspeople from 's-Hertogenbosch
Indo people
Dutch people of Indonesian descent
Dutch female badminton players
Badminton players at the 2000 Summer Olympics
Badminton players at the 2004 Summer Olympics
Olympic badminton players of the Netherlands